Kol Tappeh (also known as Gol Tappeh) is a village in Kani Bazar Rural District, Khalifan District, Mahabad County, West Azerbaijan Province, Iran. At the 2006 census, its population was 239, in 41 families.

References 

Populated places in Mahabad County